Red Cliff is a Peking opera by the China NCPA which premiered at the first anniversary of the National Grand Theatre in 2008. The director was the choreographer and PLA lieutenant general Zhang Jigang, best known as deputy chief director of the Beijing Olympic Games opening and closing ceremonies. It was written by Cai Fuchao and composed by Zhu Shaoyu.

In China the opera appeared in three versions - for older singers, youth, and children - as part of the educational purpose of the project. The opera then toured Europe.

Synopsis
A dramatised account of the Battle of Red Cliffs in 208 AD, the play is based on relevant chapters from the 14th century novel Romance of the Three Kingdoms by Luo Guanzhong.

Cast

References

External links
Preview/Teaser

Peking operas
Han dynasty in fiction
Works based on Romance of the Three Kingdoms
Plays set in the 3rd century
Hubei in fiction